In Just Hours is a Ugandan short drama film written and directed by Usama Mukwaya.  Produced through the Mariam Ndagire Film and Performing Arts Centre under the Movie Furnace project, the movie won the best film in the competition's second season.  It premiered in the Nile Diaspora International Film Festival and later screened at the Manya Human Rights Film Festival. It was also nominated in the 4th Pearl International Film Festival for best student film under the MNFPAC.

Plot 
Peter is about to be surprised by a mysterious, crude condition from the disease he has been suffering from. Weirdly the condition he is suffering from is only about to get fatal in the next few hours and if not treated quickly and carefully, he might not be sexually productive again.

Cast 

 Ssentongo Isaac as Peter
 Allen Musumba
 Veronica Nakayo
 Shafique Ssenyange

Feature film adaptation
A feature film based on the same story is in development.

References

External links 

 

Ugandan short films
Films shot in Uganda
Films directed by Usama Mukwaya
Films with screenplays by Usama Mukwaya
Ugandan drama films